This is a list of stories by the American writer Thom Jones.

References

American short stories